Bedmar y Garcíez is a city located in the province of Jaén, Spain. According to the 2006 census (INE), the municipality has a population of 3185 inhabitants. Bedmar and Garcíez were independent municipal entities until they were merged in 1975.

Localities 
 Garciez

References

Municipalities in the Province of Jaén (Spain)